Sawbridgeworth Town Football Club is an English football club based in Sawbridgeworth, Hertfordshire.

History
The club was founded in 1897 as Sawbridgeworth. In 1924, Sawbridgeworth won the East Herts League, winning the Herts Junior Cup three years later. In 1936, Sawbridgeworth joined the Spartan League. The club entered the Herts County League Division One in the 1953–54 season, but left after only one season, joining the Bishop’s Stortford, Stansted & District League and the Hertford & District League. 

Sawbridgeworth joined the Essex Olympian League, becoming founder members, in 1966 and were crowned champions in 1971–72. They joined the Essex Senior League in 1976 and changed their name to Sawbridgeworth Town. They achieved their best FA Vase performance in 1980–81 when they reached a third round replay. Sawbridgeworth finished runners-up in the league in 1992–93 and 1994–95. They achieved their best performance in the FA Cup, the first qualifying round, in 2016–17. As of the 2012–13 season, they remain members of the Essex Senior League.

Ground
Upon formation, the club played at Pishiobury Park in the south of the town. Following World War I, moved to Cambridge Road in the north of the town, later being named Crofters End.

Honours
East Herts League
Champions 1923–24
Essex Olympian League
Champions 1971–72
Herts Junior Cup
Champions 1926–27

Records
Best FA Cup performance: First qualifying round, 2016-17
Best FA Vase performance: Third round replay, 1980–81
Attendance: 610 vs Bishop's Stortford

References

External links
Official website

Football clubs in England
Hertfordshire Senior County League
Spartan League
Essex Olympian Football League
Essex Senior Football League
Association football clubs established in 1897
Football clubs in Hertfordshire
1897 establishments in England